Bymok is a river in Perm Krai, Russia, a  left tributary of the Bym, which in turn is a tributary of the Iren.

References 

Rivers of Perm Krai